Xingu State Park is a state park in the state of Mato Grosso, Brazil.

Location

The park is in the Xingu River basin.
It includes a section of the Xingu River that was outside the Xingu Indigenous Park.
The park is important in helping protect the  Xingu Indigenous Park, inhabited by fourteen ethnic groups, which is now surrounded by agricultural developments.

The park is to the south of the Menkragnoti Indigenous Territory, which is on the other side of the Xingu River.
It adjoins the Capoto/Jarina Indigenous Territory to the west.
Its boundary to the north is the border with the state of Pará.
To the east the Fontourinha stream defines its boundary.
The park is in the Amazon biome.
81.87% of the park is covered by savanna/pioneer contact, and 18% by savanna/rainforest contact.

Conservation

The reduction was justified on the basis of a referendum of the people of Santa Cruz do Xingu by technicians from the State Environmental Foundation (FEMA).
The agricultural frontier was limited by the amount of protected land, some of which had to be released for expansion of food production.

The consultative council was established on 28 September 2007. The objectives are to protect and conserve the various ecosystems and to prevent human actions that would jeopardise the future of the many indigenous groups found in the park.
The conservation unit is supported by the Amazon Region Protected Areas Program.

Notes

Sources

2001 establishments in Brazil
State parks of Brazil
Protected areas of Mato Grosso
Protected areas established in 2001